Ktyr or KTYR may refer to:
 Ktyr (fly), a genus of robber flies
 KTYR, an American radio station
 Tyler Pounds Regional Airport (ICAO: KTYR), an American airport

See also